Adnan Radnah (born 19 December 1991) is Saudi  handball player for Al-Ahli and the Saudi Arabian national team.

He represented Saudi Arabia at the 2019 World Men's Handball Championship.

References

1991 births
Living people
Saudi Arabian male handball players
21st-century Saudi Arabian people